Jan Maria Gisges (15 January 1914, in Nisko – 17 December 1983, in Warsaw) was a Polish poet, prose writer and dramatist.

He studied philology of Polish at University of Warsaw. Between 1943 and 1945 he was imprisoned by German Nazis in Auschwitz-Birkenau and other Nazi concentration camps. After the war he lived in Kielce where he worked for the county government. He was also the editor of the regional monthly "Cychry". He published his first poems in official media in 1949. Since 1949 he lived in Warsaw. He was an activist of the Polish Union of Writers.

1914 births
1983 deaths
People from Nisko
Auschwitz concentration camp survivors
20th-century Polish poets